Snitch is a 2013 American action thriller film directed by Ric Roman Waugh and starring Dwayne Johnson, based on the experiences of DEA informant James Settembrino. The film also stars Barry Pepper, Susan Sarandon, Jon Bernthal, Benjamin Bratt, and Michael Kenneth Williams. The plot focuses on John Matthews, who goes undercover for the DEA after his estranged son Jason Collins is framed in a drug deal by his best friend.

Plot 
Jason Collins is a college student, who is persuaded to allow his friend Craig to ship drugs to his house. Jason signs for the package which contains pills and a tracking device. DEA officers break into the house; Jason flees but is chased down and arrested by Agent Cooper. While at a barbecue, John Matthews, Jason's estranged father and owner of a construction company, is called by his ex-wife Sylvie about Jason being arrested. John and Sylvie meet with an investigator who says that Craig set Jason up to reduce his own sentence. Jason's charges carry a minimum of 10 years in prison. He is pressured to inform on one of his own friends to reduce his own sentence. 

Using his connections, John arranges to meet with local US Attorney Joanne Keeghan, who is running an aggressive anti-drug campaign. Keeghan agrees to reduce Jason's sentence if John will inform on a drug dealer. Cooper leads a task force which will monitor any dealings John arranges to use as evidence for an arrest. John searches through his employee records and finds that Daniel James, a new employee, has two prior distribution convictions. Daniel is currently leading a clean life to avoid a third strike. John offers $20,000 if Daniel will simply introduce him to a dealer; Daniel agrees, though he is unaware that John is acting as an informant. Daniel introduces John to Malik, an extremely dangerous, high-ranking local drug dealer, who also has two strikes. 

Explaining that his construction business cannot stay afloat in the current economy without a supplement to its revenues, John offers to run nearly limitless amounts of drugs at almost zero risk in his freight trucks. Malik agrees under the condition that John and Daniel drive the initial run themselves. John and Agent Cooper arrange for several wire taps, where he drives to the pick-up point near the Mexican border when a rival gang ambushes the pick-up, but John escapes, impressing cartel kingpin Pintera, whose men fight off the hijackers. John then makes the deal, delivering the drugs to Malik while under surveillance by Cooper. Malik mentions a meeting with cartel members higher than himself. 

Hoping to catch the higher priority targets, Cooper does not move to arrest Malik as agreed. Keeghan claims Cooper did the right thing and reneges on her promise to reduce Jason's sentence unless John cooperates in the second meeting. Outraged, John demands that Jason be released when the job is completed. Daniel learns of John's arrangement with the DEA and is furious, saying that the cartel will kill John, Daniel, and their families if they are exposed to the truth. John and Daniel send their families into hiding, where John meets with Pintera, who wants him to run nearly $100 million in drug profits into Mexico and offers to make John as a member of the cartel's inner circle if he succeeds. Keeghan relishes the prospect of arresting such a high-profile dealer, but Cooper has a change of heart and tries to talk John out of doing the run, suspecting the cartel will kill him afterwards. 

John devises a plan to free himself and Daniel from both the government and the cartel. During the run, John is able to escape Cooper's surveillance. At the same time, Daniel sneaks into Malik's house, killing his guards and mortally wounding him. Before dying, Malik reveals Pintera's cell phone number to Daniel. John calls Cooper and has him track both his new cell phone and Pintera's phone, effectively giving Cooper both the money and the kingpin at once. The cartel realizes John is an informant which leads them on a highway chase and shootout before escaping. The cartel members and the money are seized by Cooper's men. Pintera is surrounded by federal agents and surrenders because his young son is with him. Jason is released, while John and his family go into the witness protection program. John leaves a large federal reward check that he received for the capture of Pintera, for Daniel.

Cast
 Dwayne Johnson as John Matthews, Analisa’s husband, and Jason and Isabelle’s father
 Barry Pepper as DEA Agent Cooper
 Benjamin Bratt as Juan Carlos 'El Topo' Pintera
 Harold Perrineau as Assistant District Attorney Jeffery Steele
 Susan Sarandon as District Attorney Joanne Keeghan
 Jon Bernthal as Daniel James
 Michael Kenneth Williams as Malik Anderson
 Melina Kanakaredes as Sylvie Collins, John's ex-wife and Jason’s mother
 Nadine Velazquez as Analisa Matthews, John’s wife and Isabelle’s mother
 Rafi Gavron as Jason Collins, John and Sylvie’s son
 David Harbour as Jay Price
Kyara Campos as Isabelle Matthews, John and Analisa's daughter
 Jason Douglas as Wayne
 Richard Cabral as 'Flaco'
 James Allen McCune as Craig Johnson, Jason’s best friend
 J. D. Pardo as Benicio
 Kym Jackson as DEA Agent Sims
 Lela Loren as Vanessa James, Daniel's wife

Production 
Snitch is directed by Ric Roman Waugh and written by Waugh and Justin Haythe. The project was first set up in 2004 by Guy East and Nigel Sinclair, partners at Spitfire Pictures. They were inspired by a Frontline documentary about how changes to the federal drug policy of the United States encouraged the incarcerated to snitch on their accomplices. 

Haythe wrote the initial screenplay, and Waugh was hired to rewrite it. In March 2011, actor Dwayne Johnson was cast in the film's starring role.

Release 
The film is distributed by Lionsgate subsidiary Summit Entertainment.

Reception

Box office
"Snitch" opened in 2,511 theaters in the United States and grossed $13,167,607, with an average of $5,244 per theater, and ranking #2 at the box office. The film earned a total of $42,930,462 domestically and $14,894,212 internationally, for a total of $57,824,674.

Critical response
On review aggregator website Rotten Tomatoes, the film holds an approval rating of 57% based on 151 reviews, with an average rating of 5.60/10. The site's critics consensus states: "Though it features one of Dwayne Johnson's more thoughtful performances, the presentation of Snitchs underlying message is muddled by lackluster storytelling and some tonal inconsistencies." At Metacritic, the film has a weighted average score of 51 out of 100, based on 34 critics, indicating "mixed or average reviews". Audiences polled by CinemaScore gave the film an average grade of "B" on an A+ to F scale.

References

External links 

 
 

2013 films
2013 action thriller films
American action thriller films
2010s English-language films
Films about the Drug Enforcement Administration
Exclusive Media films
Films shot in Louisiana
Summit Entertainment films
Films set in Missouri
Films about drugs
Films about miscarriage of justice
Films directed by Ric Roman Waugh
Films produced by Dwayne Johnson
Films scored by Antônio Pinto
Films with screenplays by Justin Haythe
Hood films
American gang films
Action films based on actual events
Crime films based on actual events
Thriller films based on actual events
Participant (company) films
Lionsgate films
Films about Mexican drug cartels
Films about witness protection
2010s American films
2010s Mexican films